Bairak is a village in Izium Raion (district) in Kharkiv Oblast of eastern Ukraine, at about  south-east from the centre of Kharkiv city, on the right bank of the Siverskyi Donets river.

The village came under attack by Russian forces in 2022, during the Russian invasion of Ukraine.

References

Villages in Izium Raion